Snow Camp Mutual Telephone Exchange Building is a historic telephone exchange building located at Snow Camp, Alamance County, North Carolina. It was built in 1915, and is a small, square, vernacular, two-story frame structure. It has a pyramidal roof and rests on a stone foundation. One-story gabled wings were added in 1927 when the building was converted into a dwelling. A one-story kitchen addition was built in 1986. The building housed the switchboard, operator, and company telephone equipment.

It was added to the National Register of Historic Places in 1989.

References

Commercial buildings on the National Register of Historic Places in North Carolina
Commercial buildings completed in 1915
National Register of Historic Places in Alamance County, North Carolina
Telephone exchange buildings